Victor Vladimirovich Goryunov is a Russian mathematician born in 1956. He is a leading figure in Singularity theory, whose contributions to the subject are fundamental. He has published several books and a variety of papers in singularity theory, finite type invariants, and Legendrian knots. Many of his papers in Lagrangian and Legendrian geometry are now considered to be classical in the subject.

Goryunov completed his Ph.D. thesis, titled "Surface projection singularities", at Moscow's Lomonosov State University in 1981, under the direction of Vladimir Arnold. He is currently a Professor of Mathematics at the University of Liverpool. He is an editorial advisor of the journal Proceedings of the London Mathematical Society.

Publications 

He is the co-author of two published books.

Since 1978, he has published more than 50 peer reviewed articles. A list of recent publications and preprints, together with PDF files, can be found here. A list of earlier publications can be found on his university webpage.

References

External links 
 
 

Academics of the University of Liverpool
Living people
20th-century Russian mathematicians
21st-century Russian mathematicians
Moscow State University alumni
Topologists
Mathematicians from Moscow
1956 births